The Technological Educational Institute of Western Greece was a Greek tertiary educational institution, based in Patras with more than 20,000 students.

History 
In the course of time, the former TEI of Western Greece had several names. It started its operation as KATEE in 1970 and then renamed as KATE. Later, with the founding law of TEI in 1983, it was renamed to TEI of Patras. In 2013 with the "Athena" Plan, the TEI of Patras and the TEI of Messolonghi merged and became the name of TEI of Western Greece. In 2019 by law 4610/2019 TEI of Western Greece is abolished and the schools STEG & TETROD, SDO and SEYP together with their departments are absorbed by the University of Patras, while the STEF is absorbed by the University of Peloponnese. This law comes to renew the map of Higher Education by creating, merging and removing schools and departments. The operation of most departments starts from the academic year 2019–2020.

Technological Educational Institute of Patras - TEIPAT  
The Technological Educational Institute of Patras (TEIPAT) was founded in 1970 as a higher technological educational center, located 4 km from the city center of Patras, in a  campus. It was founded as an independent and self-governed public body that belonged to the Greek higher education according to Laws 2916/2001, 3549/2007, 3685/2008 and 3794/2009.

TEIPAT comprised the following faculties: School of Technological Applications, School of Management and Economy and School of Healthcare Science.

Technological Educational Institute of Missolonghi - TEIMES 
Technological Educational Institute of Missolonghi (TEIMES) was a higher education public institute (university) specialized in applied technologies, located 4 km outside the city of Missolonghi. It was founded in 1981.

The institute had two campuses, the main campus in Missolonghi Area and the second campus in the city of Nafpaktos and  comprised three Schools, each consisting of eight Departments.

"ATHENA" Reform Plan Merge 
The "ATHENA" Reform Plan restructured Higher Education programmes in 2013. As a result, Technological Institutes of Messolonghi and Patras were merged to form Technological Institute of Western Greece.
In 2019 the Technological Educational Institute of Western Greece was incorporated into the University of Patras [N.4610/109, ΦΕΚ 70/7,5,2019 (Α' 70)], while the engineering school was incorporated into the University of Peloponnese.

Facilities 
The former TEI headquarters Western Greece is located in the suburb Koukouli of Patras and is surrounded by the streets of Alexander the Great, Dominicos Theotokopoulou, Nikolaos Gyzi, Emmanouil Panselinou and Kalavryta. The headquarters of the university are Patras in six (6) cities of Western Greece (Patras, Mesolongi, Pyrgos, Nafpaktos, Antirrio, Amaliada and Aigio).The School of Agricultural Technology and Food and Nutrition Technology (STEG & TETROD) and the School of Management and Economics (SDO) were based in Mesolongi, while the School of Health and Welfare (SEYP) and the School of Technology .

Schools and departments
The university includes four Schools, consisting of nineteen Departments.

Academic evaluation
In 2016 the external evaluation committee gave TEI of Western Greece a Partially positive evaluation.

An external evaluation of all academic departments in Greek universities was conducted by the Hellenic Quality Assurance and Accreditation Agency (HQA).

See also 
 List of universities in Greece
 University of Patras, a university located in Patras, established in 1964
 University of Peloponnese, a university located in various towns of Peloponnese, established in 2002

References

External links 
TEIWEST
 TEI of Western Greece - Official Webpage 
 Hellenic Quality Assurance and Accreditation Agency (HQA) 
 TEIWEST Quality Assurance Unit 
 Greek Research and Technology Network (GRNET) 
 Hellenic Academic Libraries Link (HEAL-Link) 

TEIMES
 TEI of Messolonghi - Official Webpage 

TEIPAT
 TEI of Patras DASTA Office (Career and Innovation Office) 

1970 establishments in Greece
1981 establishments in Greece
2013 establishments in Greece
Educational institutions established in 1970
Educational institutions established in 1981
Educational institutions established in 2013
Missolonghi
Buildings and structures in Aetolia-Acarnania